is a former Japanese football player.

Playing career
Koyama was born in Hiroshima Prefecture on September 5, 1972. After graduating from Fukuoka University, he joined Regional Leagues club Oita Trinity (later Oita Trinita) in 1995. He played many matches as regular goalkeeper and the club was promoted to Japan Football League from 1996 and J2 League from 1999. However he could hardly play in the match behind new member Kazuya Maekawa (2000-01) and Hayato Okanaka (2002-03) from 2000. Although the club won the champions in 2002 and was promoted to J1 League from 2003, he could not play at all in the match in J1 League competition. In 2004, he moved to J2 club Yokohama FC. However he could hardly play in the match behind Takanori Sugeno. The club won the champions in 2006 and was promoted to J1 from 2007. However he could not play at all in the match in J1 again and the club was relegated to J2 in a year. In 2008, Sugeno left the club wand Koyama became a regular goalkeeper. However he could hardly play in the match behind young goalkeeper Takuo Okubo in 2009 and retired end of 2009 season.

Club statistics

References

External links

1972 births
Living people
Fukuoka University alumni
Association football people from Hiroshima Prefecture
Japanese footballers
J1 League players
J2 League players
Japan Football League (1992–1998) players
Oita Trinita players
Yokohama FC players
Association football goalkeepers